Fletcher may refer to:

People and fictional characters
 Fletcher (surname), including lists of people and fictional characters
 Fletcher (given name), lists of people and fictional characters
 Fletcher (occupation), a person who fletches arrows, the origin of the surname
 Fletcher (singer), American actress and singer-songwriter Cari Elise Fletcher (born 1994)

Places

United States
 Fletcher, California, a former settlement
 Fletcher, the original name of Aurora, Colorado, a home rule municipality
 Fletcher, Illinois, an unincorporated community
 Fletcher, Indiana, an unincorporated town
 Fletcher, Missouri, an unincorporated community
 Fletcher, North Carolina, a suburb of Asheville
 Fletcher, Ohio, a village
 Fletcher, Oklahoma, a town
 Fletcher, Vermont, a town
 Fletcher, Virginia, an unincorporated community
 Fletcher, West Virginia, an unincorporated community
 Fletcher Hills, San Diego County, California, a mountain range
 Fletcher Pond, Michigan, a man-made body of water

Antarctica
 Fletcher Islands, George V Land
 Fletcher Island, largest of the Fletcher Islands
 Fletcher Peninsula, Ellsworth Land
 Fletcher Ice Rise

Elsewhere
 Fletcher, New South Wales, Australia, a suburb of Newcastle
 Fletcher, Ontario, Canada, a farming community
 Fletcher Island (Nunavut), Canada
 Fletcher's Canal, Greater Manchester, England
 3265 Fletcher, an asteroid

Aviation
 Fletcher Aviation, a US aircraft manufacturer
 PAC Fletcher, a New Zealand agricultural aircraft
 Fletcher Field, a public-use airport in Coahoma County, Mississippi

Ships
 Fletcher class, a type of US Navy destroyer
 USS Fletcher (DD-445), lead ship of the Fletcher class, served during World War II
 USS Fletcher (DD-992), a destroyer

Education
 The Fletcher School of Law and Diplomacy, a graduate school of Tufts University, Medford, Massachusetts
 Duncan U. Fletcher High School, Neptune Beach, Florida, United States
 Fletcher High School, Gweru, Zimbabwe
 Fletcher Hall (Gainesville, Florida), a dormitory building on the campus of the University of Florida

Other uses
 Fletcher Construction, a major New Zealand construction company
 Fletcher baronets, four titles, one of which is still extant
 Fletcher Collection, a collection of British postage stamps in the British Library
 Fletcher (typeface), a geometrically constructed blackletter typeface
 Needlegun or fletcher, a firearm that fires flechettes

See also
 Fletcher's checksum, a checksum used to provide error-detection in computing